Abbie Jane Myers (born 18 July 1994) is an Australian tennis player. She has career-high WTA rankings of 257 in singles and 182 in doubles. Myers has won one singles title and 17 doubles titles on tournaments of the ITF Women's Circuit.

She notably represented Australia at the World Junior Competition at the age of 14. On the ITF Junior Circuit, Myers reached a career-high ranking of 52, on 2 January 2012, and she won the 2012 Australian 18's Championships.

Career

2013–21
Myers made her WTA Tour main-draw debut at the 2013 Sydney International doubles tournament, partnering Storm Sanders. They lost in the first round.
At the 2013 Australian Open, she lost in the first round of the qualifying draw to Chan Yung-jan.

2022
In January, Myers lost in the first round of the Australian Open qualifying.

ITF Circuit finals

Singles: 3 (1 title, 2 runner-ups)

Doubles: 25 (17 titles, 8 runner-ups)

References

External links
 
 
 
 
 

1994 births
Living people
Australian female tennis players
Tennis players from Sydney